Lambert's Point Knitting Mill, also known as The Knitting Mill and Old Dominion Paper Company, is a historic mill building located at Norfolk, Virginia. It was built in 1895, and consists of the central two-story original mill building highlighted by a tall four-story tower.  It was augmented in the 1950s by a one-story addition on the south elevation, and by additional one-story additions on the north and west sides of the building. The masonry structure is clad with smooth-finished concrete stucco.

It was listed on the National Register of Historic Places in 2006.

References

Industrial buildings and structures on the National Register of Historic Places in Virginia
Industrial buildings completed in 1895
Buildings and structures in Norfolk, Virginia
National Register of Historic Places in Norfolk, Virginia
Cotton mills in the United States